Nicolaas Bloembergen (March 11, 1920 – September 5, 2017) was a Dutch-American physicist and Nobel laureate, recognized for his work in developing driving principles behind nonlinear optics for laser spectroscopy. During his career, he was a professor at Harvard University and later at the University of Arizona and at Leiden University in 1973 (as Lorentz Professor).

Bloembergen shared the 1981 Nobel Prize in Physics along with Arthur Schawlow and Kai Siegbahn because their work "has had a profound effect on our present knowledge of the constitution of matter" through the use of laser spectroscopy. In particular, Bloembergen was singled out because he "founded a new field of science we now call non-linear optics" by mixing "two or more beams of laser light... in order to produce laser light of a different wave length" and thus significantly broaden the laser spectroscopy frequency band.

Early life
Bloembergen was born in Dordrecht on March 11, 1920, where his father was a chemical engineer and executive. He had five siblings, with his brother Auke later becoming a legal scholar. In 1938, Bloembergen entered the University of Utrecht to study physics. However, during World War II, the German authorities closed the university and Bloembergen spent two years in hiding.

Career

Graduate studies

Bloembergen left the war-ravaged Netherlands in 1945 to pursue graduate studies at Harvard University under Professor Edward Mills Purcell. Through Purcell, Bloembergen was part of the prolific academic lineage tree of J. J. Thomson, which includes many other Nobel Laureates, beginning with Thomson himself (Physics Nobel, 1906) and Lord Rayleigh (Physics Nobel, 1904), Ernest Rutherford (Chemistry Nobel 1908), Owen Richardson (Physics Nobel, 1928), and finally Purcell (Physics, Nobel 1952). Bloembergen's other influences include John Van Vleck (Physics Nobel, 1977) and Percy Bridgman (Physics Nobel, 1946).

Six weeks before his arrival, Purcell and his graduate students Torrey and Pound discovered nuclear magnetic resonance (NMR). Bloembergen was hired to develop the first NMR machine. At Harvard he attended lectures by Schwinger, Van Vleck, and Kemble. Bloembergen's NMR systems are the predecessors of modern-day MRI machines, which are used to examine internal organs and tissues. Bloembergen's research on NMR led to an interest in masers, which were introduced in 1953 and are the predecessors of lasers.

Bloembergen returned to the Netherlands in 1947, and submitted his thesis Nuclear Magnetic Relaxation at the University of Leiden. This was because he had completed all the preliminary  examinations in the Netherlands, and Cor Gorter of Leiden offered him a postdoctoral appointment there. He received his Ph.D. degree from Leiden in 1948, and then was a postdoc at Leiden for about a year.

Professorship
In 1949, he returned to Harvard as a Junior Fellow of the Society of Fellows. In 1951, he became an associate professor; he then became Gordon McKay Professor of Applied Physics in 1957; Rumford Professor of Physics in 1974; and Gerhard Gade University Professor in 1980. In 1990 he retired from Harvard.

In addition, Bloembergen served as a visiting professor. From 1964 to 1965, Bloembergen was a visiting professor at the University of California, Berkeley. In 1996–1997, he was a visiting scientist at the College of Optical Sciences of the University of Arizona; he became a professor at Arizona in 2001.

Bloembergen was a member of the Board of Sponsors of the Bulletin of the Atomic Scientists and Honorary Editor of the Journal of Nonlinear Optical Physics & Materials.

Laser spectroscopy

By 1960 while at Harvard, he experimented with microwave spectroscopy. Bloembergen had modified the maser of Charles Townes, and in 1956, Bloembergen developed a crystal maser, which was more powerful than the standard gaseous version.

With the advent of the laser, he participated in the development of the field of laser spectroscopy, which allows precise observations of atomic structure using lasers. Following the development of second-harmonic generation by Peter Franken and others in 1961, Bloembergen studied how when one bombards matter with a focused and high-intensity beam of photons, a new structure of matter is revealed. This he termed the study of nonlinear optics. In reflection to his work in a Dutch newspaper in 1990, Bloembergen said: "We took a standard textbook on optics and for each section we asked ourselves what would happen if the intensity was to become very high. We were almost certain that we were bound to encounter an entirely new type of physics within that domain".

From this theoretical work, Bloembergen found ways to combine two or more laser sources consisting of photons in the visible light frequency range to generate a single laser source with photons of different frequencies in the infrared and ultraviolet ranges, which extends the amount of atomic detail that can be gathered from laser spectroscopy.

Awards
He was awarded the Lorentz Medal in 1978. He received the Bijvoet Medal of the Bijvoet Center for Biomolecular Research of Utrecht University in 2001.

Bloembergen shared the 1981 Nobel Prize in Physics with Arthur Schawlow, along with Kai Siegbahn. The Nobel Foundation awarded Bloembergen and Schawlow "for their contribution to the development of laser spectroscopy".

Personal life and death
Bloembergen met Huberta Deliana Brink (Deli) in 1948 while on vacation with his university's Physics Club. She was able to travel with Bloembergen to the United States in 1949 on a student hospitality exchange program; he proposed to her when they arrived in the States, and were married by 1950 on return to Amsterdam. They were both naturalized as citizens of the United States in 1958. They had three children.

Bloembergen died on September 5, 2017, at an assisted living facility in his hometown Tucson, Arizona of cardiorespiratory failure, at the age of 97.

Biography 
In 2016 a Dutch biography was published, and in 2019 an English one.

Legacy 
On March 11, 2020, the day of Bloembergen's 100th birthday, a team of researchers at the University of New South Wales published an article in Nature, demonstrating for the first time the successful coherent control of the nucleus of a single atom using only electric fields, an idea first proposed by Bloembergen back in 1961.

Honors

 Corresponding member, Royal Netherlands Academy of Arts and Sciences, Amsterdam, 1956
 Fellow of the American Physical Society, 1955 
 Fellow, American Academy of Arts and Sciences, 1956
 Member, National Academy of Sciences, Washington, D.C., 1960
 Foreign Honorary Member, Indian Academy of Sciences, Bangalore, 1978
 Associé Étranger, Académie des Sciences, Paris, 1981
 Member, American Philosophical Society, 1982
 Guggenheim Fellow, 1957
 Oliver Buckley Prize, American Physical Society, 1958
 IEEE Morris N. Liebmann Memorial Award, Institute of Radio Engineers, 1959
 Stuart Ballantine Medal, Franklin Institute, Philadelphia, 1961
 National Medal of Science, President of the United States of America, 1974
 Lorentz Medal, Royal Netherlands Academy of Arts and Sciences, Amsterdam, 1978
 Frederic Ives Medal, Optical Society of America, 1979
 Von Humboldt Senior Scientist, 1980
 Member, German Academy of Sciences Leopoldina, 1983
 Member Emeritus, United States National Academy of Engineering, 1984

References

External links

  including the Nobel Lecture, December 8, 1981 Nonlinear Optics and Spectroscopy
 Freeview video 'An Interview with Nicolaas Bloembergen' by the Vega Science Trust
 their contribution to the development of laser spectroscopy
 Oral history interview transcript with Nicolaas Bloembergen on 22 March 1977, American Institute of Physics, Niels Bohr Library and Archives - interview conducted by Katherine Sopka at Harvard University
 Oral History interview transcript with Nicolaas Bloembergen on 27 June 1983, American Institute of Physics, Niels Bohr Library and Archives - interview conducted by Joan Bromberg and Paul L. Kelley at Harvard University
 NICOLAAS BLOEMBERGEN (2008) From Millisecond to Attosecond Laser Pulses

1920 births
2017 deaths
Members of the United States National Academy of Sciences
American Nobel laureates
20th-century American physicists
American agnostics
Dutch emigrants to the United States
Dutch Nobel laureates
20th-century Dutch physicists
Experimental physicists
Optical physicists
Harvard University alumni
Harvard University faculty
IEEE Medal of Honor recipients
Leiden University alumni
Utrecht University alumni
Members of the French Academy of Sciences
Members of the Royal Netherlands Academy of Arts and Sciences
National Medal of Science laureates
Nobel laureates in Physics
Lorentz Medal winners
People from Dordrecht
University of Arizona faculty
Spectroscopists
Members of the United States National Academy of Engineering
Oliver E. Buckley Condensed Matter Prize winners
Fellows of Optica (society)
Members of the German Academy of Sciences Leopoldina
Bijvoet Medal recipients
Fellows of the American Physical Society
Members of the American Philosophical Society
Presidents of the American Physical Society